Rosa is a town in Blount County, Alabama, United States. At the 2020 census, the population was 376.

Geography
Rosa is located in central Blount County at 33°59'23.316" North, 86°30'42.977" West (33.989810, -86.511938). Its town limits extend southeast to border the city of Oneonta, the county seat. US-231 leads west  to Cleveland and then north  to Huntsville.

Demographics

As of the census of 2000, there were 313 people, 125 households, and 93 families residing in the town. The racial makeup of the town was 99.68% White and 0.32% Native American. 0.64% of the population were Hispanic or Latino of any race.

There were 125 households, out of which 39.2% had children under the age of 18 living with them, 63.2% were married couples living together, 5.6% had a female householder with no husband present, and 25.6% were non-families. 24.8% of all households were made up of individuals, and 14.4% had someone living alone who was 65 years of age or older. The average household size was 2.50 and the average family size was 2.99.

In the town, the age distribution of the population shows 27.8% under the age of 18, 6.7% from 18 to 24, 28.8% from 25 to 44, 20.4% from 45 to 64, and 16.3% who were 65 years of age or older. The median age was 36 years. For every 100 females, there were 107.3 males. For every 100 females age 18 and over, there were 101.8 males.

The median income for a household in the town was $40,000, and the median income for a family was $56,563. Males had a median income of $31,250 versus $30,625 for females. The per capita income for the town was $17,042. About 6.2% of families and 7.5% of the population were below the poverty line, including 14.5% of those under age 18 and 3.4% of those age 65 or over.

References

External links

Towns in Blount County, Alabama
Towns in Alabama
Birmingham metropolitan area, Alabama